BluShift Aerospace (sometimes stylized as bluShift Aerospace) is an employee-owned American aerospace firm based in Brunswick, Maine. Targeting the growing smallsat and cubesat launch markets, bluShift is developing suborbital sounding rockets and small-lift orbital rockets which will be launched from a proposed new spaceport in Maine. The company has received primary funding from NASAs SBIR grant program, the National Science Foundations I-Corps grant program, the Maine Technology Institute, and the Maine Space Grant Consortium. The company has active operations at the former Brunswick Naval Air Station and Loring Air Force Base.

History
bluShift Aerospace was founded on the vision of rockets powered by a bio-derived fuel, making them safer for handlers and the environment. This new propulsion technology will allow bluShift to offer cost-competitive rideshares for small numbers of cubesats at a time, to client-preferred orbits, with low wait times to launch. All of their vehicles currently in development will use their proprietary biofuel and liquid nitrous oxide as propellants in a hybrid rocket engine, with the size and number of engines scaling for different sized rockets.

Timeline
In mid-2013, brothers Sascha and Justin Deri discovered an organic substance on Justin's farm in Maine; they began testing the substance as a potential rocket fuel. In March 2014, Sascha founded bluShift and began iteratively testing the new bio-derived solid fuel, sourced from the same organic substance found on his brother's farm.

In 2016, the company moved from Massachusetts to Brunswick Landing in Maine.

In 2017, bluShift optimized its biofuel formulation with the help of a grant from the Maine Technology Institute.

In 2019, bluShift optimized its modular hybrid rocket engine with the help of a NASA SBIR grant. State Senator Shenna Bellows sponsored legislation to support the development of a spaceport and launch site in Maine. The company's first test launch was initially planned for 2019, but was postponed to early 2020. When the COVID-19 pandemic reached Maine in March 2020, the launch was postponed further, first being scheduled for 21 October 2020.

In 2020, bluShift concluded its engine test firing campaign, with 154 successful static fires, and attempted its first test launch. bluShift performed a low-altitude test launch of the Stardust rocket at the beginning of 2021, marking the first commercial bio-fueled rocket launch, as well as the first commercial rocket launch in New England.

In March 2021, bluShift opened to public investment and funding, with a primary goal of US$500,000 and a secondary goal of US$1,070,000. As of July 2021 they had surpassed $620,000 in investments. In early September when the first round of investing closed, they had raised over $800,000. They opened a second round of investing in late 2021, and by April 2022 when that round ended, they had reached $1.1 million.

In June 2021, bluShift announced they had received their first purchase order from Virginia-based company Max IQ to launch scientific experiment payloads for universities and other research institutions. The agreement calls for up to 60 small satellites to be launched at a cadence of no less than twice per year.

In October 2021 the company began constructing the full-scale MAREVL engine and performing a series of static fire tests, preceding the launch of Starless Rogue Beta, a scaled down version of the Starless Rogue suborbital launch vehicle. The first successful static fire of the full-scale MAREVL 2.0 engine was completed in March 2022. Several more static fire tests are planned for 2022.

In December 2021, after the team had scouted out locations earlier in the year, narrowed down a list of several potential sites on the coast of Hancock County and Washington County, and following the regulatory approval process with the local governments, the launch site was announced to be about 30 miles east of Bar Harbor near the towns of Jonesport and Beals.

The company plans to begin launching to orbit by early 2024. Due to Maine's high latitude, their orbital rockets will launch to high-inclination and polar orbits. They also are considering Wallops LC-1 and Cape Canaveral LC-48 as potential suborbital and low-inclination orbital launch sites, respectively, to use in the future.

Launch attempt history

MAREVL engine
All bluShift launch vehicles announced thus far will utilize and be based around the Modular Adaptable Rocket Engine for Vehicle Launch (MAREVL) engine in various configurations. This is a hybrid (solid fuel/liquid oxidizer) engine which will be scalable and modular, able to be used in clusters for different vehicle configurations.

MAREVL 2.0, the full-scale version to be used in Starless Rogue and Red Dwarf, is expected to produce  of thrust and consume  of propellant (both fuel and oxidizer combined) per second.

Engine testing
MAREVL prototypes were test fired at the facility in Brunswick between 2014 and 2018 along with prototype mixtures of the biofuel. A scaled-down version completed its test firing campaign in 2019, and was subsequently used on the Stardust rocket. MAREVL 2.0 is currently undergoing a testing campaign, which the engineering team expects will include more than 20 static fire tests, which are performed on a custom engine testing mount built by the company at their facility in Brunswick. The first static fire test in its campaign, a ~5-second long burn of the full-scale MAREVL 2.0 engine, was completed in March 2022.

Launch vehicles

Stardust
Stardust rockets are launched from a mobile launch stand that is horizontal during transportation, then raised to vertical at the launch site. The truss on the stand is about 3 times the height of the rocket, and has flame diverters at the base. The launch stand and associated ground equipment is powered by several mobile solar electrical power units.

Stardust 1
First successfully launched on 31 January 2021. There is a possibility of future Stardust 1 experimental launches with minor upgrades and changes.

Stardust 2
Formerly planned single-stage reusable prototype, now appears to be replaced by Starless Rogue Beta. Payload capacity would have been 30 kg. Maximum altitude was expected to have been between 10–50 km (6–30 miles).

Starless Rogue
A two-stage suborbital launch vehicle, with the first stage consisting of a cluster of MAREVL engine units, and the upper stage and payload section similar to the Stardust 2 vehicle. Will provide about 6–10 minutes of microgravity for  payloads on suborbital trajectories of up to 250 km (155 mi). The vehicle can also serve as a hypersonics testbed.

Starless Rogue Beta
A scaled down version of Starless Rogue, with only a single stage with one MAREVL engine, used for high altitude and supersonic testing. Uses the smaller payload section based on Stardust 1; regular Starless Rogue has the larger payload section based on Stardust 2.

Red Dwarf
A two-stage orbital launch vehicle with  payload capacity to low Earth orbit. The focus will be on polar and Sun-synchronous orbit orbits with an eventual biweekly launch cadence. First launch is planned for 2024.

Brown Dwarf
Was a planned multi-stage sub-orbital launch test vehicle to prepare for regular orbital operational launches with the Red Dwarf rocket. Appears to be no longer actively planned and its purpose replaced by the Stardust and Starless Rogue groups of vehicles.

Recovery and reusability
BluShift demonstrated a simple parachute recovery system on their first suborbital launch of Stardust 1. The Stardust 1 rocket was ultimately not relaunched, instead only being used for post-flight analysis.

BluShift has stated that they plan to recover all stages and payload sections of their suborbital rockets, as well as the first and possibly second stages of their orbital rockets, using parachutes which allow the stages to soft-splashdown off the coast of Maine, where they will be recovered by modified lobster boats used by the recovery team. They expect the stages to endure atmospheric reentry without many issues due to relatively low speeds, and the effects of salt-water on the rocket hardware will be negligible and will not add significantly to the refurbishment time. They claim reusability has been designed into the rocket systems, such as eliminating extra propellant plumbing by using a hybrid rocket design with a solid fuel and liquid oxidizer.

See also 
 Similar companies
 VALT Enterprises
 Rocket Lab
 Firefly Aerospace
 Relativity Space
 Orbex
 Exos Aerospace
 LIA Aerospace
 Maritime Launch Services
 Astra Space
 Related articles
 List of rocket launch sites
 List of orbital launch systems
 List of private spaceflight companies

References

External links 
 

Aerospace companies of the United States
Aerospace companies